Marion Maubon (born 27 July 1989) is a French female handball player who plays for Metz Handball.

International honours 
Challenge Cup:
Winner: 2015

References
    

     
1989 births
Living people 
Sportspeople from Bordeaux
French female handball players